Edgewater-Paisano is a suburb of Mathis, Texas and a census-designated place (CDP) in San Patricio County, Texas, United States. The population was 182 at the 2000 census.

The Edgewater-Paisano CDP was deleted in the 2010 census and parts taken to form Edgewater Estates and Paisano Park CDPs.

Geography
Edgewater-Paisano is located at  (28.096048, -97.862754).

Demographics
As of the census of 2000, there were 182 people, 60 households, and 46 families residing in the CDP. The population density was 656.3 people per square mile (251.0/km2). There were 69 housing units at an average density of 248.8/sq mi (95.1/km2). The racial makeup of the CDP was 60.99% White, 0.55% African American, 31.87% from other races, and 6.59% from two or more races. Hispanic or Latino of any race were 68.68% of the population.

There were 60 households, out of which 38.3% had children under the age of 18 living with them, 58.3% were married couples living together, 16.7% had a female householder with no husband present, and 21.7% were non-families. 20.0% of all households were made up of individuals, and 11.7% had someone living alone who was 65 years of age or older. The average household size was 3.03 and the average family size was 3.51.

In the CDP, the population was spread out, with 33.5% under the age of 18, 7.7% from 18 to 24, 24.2% from 25 to 44, 24.7% from 45 to 64, and 9.9% who were 65 years of age or older. The median age was 31 years. For every 100 females, there were 93.6 males. For every 100 females age 18 and over, there were 108.6 males.

The median income for a household in the CDP was $26,111, and the median income for a family was $26,667. Males had a median income of $16,607 versus $17,083 for females. The per capita income for the CDP was $9,080. About 41.3% of families and 40.4% of the population were below the poverty line, including 50.0% of those under the age of eighteen and 22.7% of those 65 or over.

Education
Edgewater-Paisano is served by the Mathis Independent School District.

References

Census-designated places in San Patricio County, Texas
Census-designated places in Texas
Corpus Christi metropolitan area